Liam Walsh (12 September 1998 – 19 September 2021) was a professional rugby league footballer who played as a second-row forward for the Widnes Vikings in the Betfred Championship.

In 2017 he made his Super League début for Widnes against the Leeds Rhinos.

He died on 19 September 2021, aged 23, after being hit by a car in Widnes around 11.52pm on Saturday 18 September.

References

External links
Leeds Rhinos v Widnes Vikings

1998 births
2021 deaths
English rugby league players
Rugby league second-rows
Widnes Vikings players
Road incident deaths in England
Pedestrian road incident deaths